Attila Gelencsér (born January 14, 1968) is a Hungarian politician, member of the National Assembly (MP) for Kaposvár (Somogy County Constituency II then I) since 2010.

He served as the President of the Somogy County General Assembly between 2006 and 2014.

Personal life
He is married and has three children - two daughters and one son.

References

1968 births
Living people
Fidesz politicians
Members of the National Assembly of Hungary (2010–2014)
Members of the National Assembly of Hungary (2014–2018)
Members of the National Assembly of Hungary (2018–2022)
Members of the National Assembly of Hungary (2022–2026)
People from Kaposvár